The Social Exclusion Task Force (SETF) was a part of the Cabinet Office that provided the UK Government with strategic advice and policy analysis in its drive against social exclusion. It was preceded by the Social Exclusion Unit, which was set up by the Labour government in 1997 and formed part of the Office of the Deputy Prime Minister. The SETF was abolished in November 2010, and its functions absorbed into the Office for Civil Society.

Social Exclusion Unit
The SEU, launched on 8 December 1997, outlined social exclusion as: 

The SEU published over 50 reports in many areas of social policy. Subjects explored included rough sleeping, teenage pregnancy, mental health, older people. A report called Reducing Re-Offending by Ex-prisoners was published in July 2002, identifying the needs of prisoners' families and the problems they faced. In July 2004 the Home Office published its response Reducing Re-offending National Action Plan. The Action Plan's recommendations were criticised as "very disappointing and extremely weak" and "elementary" by the Home Affairs Select Committee.

In 2005, the SEU published Transitions: Young Adults with Complex Needs which identified 27 cross-governmental action points to improve support for 16- to 25-year-olds by teaching them "basic life skills".

Social Exclusion Task Force
In 2006, the SEU merged with the Prime Minister's Strategy Unit. The task force aimed to ensure that Government departments work together to deliver services for the most disadvantaged members of society. It was located in Admiralty Arch, part of the Cabinet Office's buildings in Whitehall and employed around thirty staff. The director at the time of its abolition was Naomi Eisenstadt.

See also 
 Asociality
 NEET
 Disconnected youth
 Homelessness
 Social alienation
 Social invisibility
 Social rejection
 Youth exclusion

Selected publications
Bringing Britain Together: a National Strategy for Neighbourhood Renewal
Teenage Pregnancy, June 1999
Making the Connections: Final report on transport and social exclusion
Mental health and social exclusion
Preventing social exclusion
Jobs and Enterprise in Deprived Areas
A Sure Start to Later Life
Transitions: Young Adults with Complex Needs

References

External links
 Social Exclusion Task Force
 Reaching Out

Public bodies and task forces of the United Kingdom government
1997 establishments in the United Kingdom
2010 disestablishments in the United Kingdom
Social issues in the United Kingdom